Art punk is a subgenre of punk rock in which artists go beyond the genre's rudimentary garage rock and are considered more sophisticated than their peers. These groups still generated punk's aesthetic of being simple, offensive, and free-spirited, but essentially attracted audiences other than the angry, working-class ones that surrounded pub rock.

History
In the rock music of the 1970s, the "art" descriptor was generally understood to mean either "aggressively avant-garde" or "pretentiously progressive". Musicologists Simon Frith and Howard Horne described the band managers of the 1970s punk bands as "the most articulate theorists of the art punk movement", with Bob Last of Fast Product identified as one of the first to apply art theory to marketing, and Tony Wilson's Factory Records described as "applying the Bauhaus principle of the same 'look' for all the company's goods". Wire's Colin Newman described art punk in 2006 as "the drug of choice of a whole generation".

Anna Szemere traces the beginnings of the Hungarian art-punk subculture to 1978, when punk band the Spions performed three concerts which drew on conceptualist performance art and Antonin Artaud's Theatre of Cruelty, with neo-avant-garde/anarchist manifestos handed out to the audience.

Various 1990s and 2000s bands associated with post-hardcore also were dubbed as art punk, including Refused, At the Drive-In, the Blood Brothers, Enter Shikari, Brand New and Metric.

References

Bibliography
 

20th-century music genres
Punk rock genres

British styles of music
British rock music genres
American rock music genres